Girl in the Case is a 1944 American film. Budd Boetticher did some uncredited directing on it. It was originally directed by William Berke.

Boetticher says " they fired the director and I got the job, and I finished the picture. It was another short schedule picture."

Cast
Edmund Lowe
Janis Carter

References

External links

Girl in the Case at TCMDB

1944 films
American mystery films
1944 mystery films
American black-and-white films
1940s English-language films
1940s American films